The 2013 Keio Challenger was a professional tennis tournament played on hard courts. It was the ninth edition of the tournament which was part of the 2013 ATP Challenger Tour. It took place in Yokohama, Japan between 11 and 17 November 2013. Mathew Ebden was the tournament champion over Go Soeda.

Singles main-draw entrants

Seeds

 1 Rankings are as of November 4, 2013.

Other entrants
The following players received wildcards into the singles main draw:
  Borna Ćorić
  Yoshihito Nishioka
  Masato Shiga
  Kaichi Uchida

The following players used protected ranking into the singles main draw:
  Daniel Kosakowski

The following players received entry from the qualifying draw:
  Chase Buchanan
  Chung Hyeon
  Shuichi Sekiguchi
  Yasutaka Uchiyama

Champions

Singles

 Matthew Ebden def.  Go Soeda 2–6, 7–6(7–3), 6–3

Doubles

 Bradley Klahn /  Michael Venus def.  Sanchai Ratiwatana /  Sonchat Ratiwatana 7–5, 6–1

External links
Official Website

 
Keio Challenger
Keio Challenger
2013 in Japanese tennis